Evelien Gerrits (born 17 January 1985) is a former Dutch international cricketer whose career for the Dutch national side spanned from 2009 to 2011.

Gerrits made her One Day International (ODI) and Twenty20 International debuts for the Netherlands in consecutive days, with both coming against Ireland in August 2009. The following year, she played several matches at the 2010 ICC Women's Challenge, though with little success. A right-arm pace bowler, Gerrits' best performance for the Netherlands came in April 2011, in a Twenty20 International against Pakistan. Opening the bowling, she dismissed Nida Dar from the first ball of the match, and finished with figures of 3/13, the best by a Dutchwoman in a Twenty20 International. Gerrits took only one wicket across her ODI and T20I career, with her final international coming against Ireland in August 2011.

References

1985 births
Living people
Dutch women cricketers
Netherlands women One Day International cricketers
Netherlands women Twenty20 International cricketers
20th-century Dutch women
21st-century Dutch women